Events from the year 1620 in Ireland.

Incumbent
Monarch: James I

Events
County Longford is planted by English and Scottish landowners, with much of the O'Farrell lands being confiscated and granted to new owners.
Bangor, County Down, is granted the status of a port by King James I of England.

Honours
13 October – the Blundell Baronetcy is created in the Baronetage of Ireland in favour of Francis Blundell, Vice-Treasurer and Receiver-General of Ireland.
10 November – the Parsons Baronetcy, of Bellamont in the County of Dublin, is created in the Baronetage of Ireland in favour of William Parsons, Surveyor General of Ireland.
12 December – the title of Earl of Antrim is created in the Peerage of Ireland in favour of Randal MacDonnell, Viscount Dunluce.
The titles of Earl of Cork and Viscount of Dungarvan are created in the Peerage of Ireland in favour of Richard Boyle, Lord Boyle.
The title of Viscount Grandison is created in the Peerage of Ireland in favour of Oliver St John, Lord Deputy of Ireland.

Births
Peter Talbot, Archbishop of Dublin (Roman Catholic) (d. 1680)
Approximate date – Redmond O'Hanlon, outlaw (d. 1681)

Deaths
February 15 – James Archer, Jesuit (b. 1550)
July 10 – John Boyle, Bishop of Cork, Cloyne and Ross (b. 1563?)

 
1620s in Ireland
Ireland
Years of the 17th century in Ireland